"A Lot of Things Different"' is a song composed by American country singer-songwriter Bill Anderson and songwriter Dean Dillon. It was recorded in two separate versions. The first version was recorded by Anderson himself in 2001. A version by Kenny Chesney appeared one year later on his 2002 album and was later released as a single.

Bill Anderson version
Bill Anderson recorded the original version of "A Lot of Things Different". In 2016, he recalled the experience of writing the song with Dean Dillon. "When we wrote 'A Lot of Things Different' in 2002, I was at the point then that I could look over my shoulder and say, 'Golly, I’d do that different if I had the chance to do that again.' You gain wisdom," he reflected.

Anderson recorded the track at Sony Firehall Studio. It was produced by Anderson in conjunction with Rex Schnelle. The original version was released on Anderson's 2001 album of the same name, which was issued on TWI Records and Varèse Sarabande.

Kenny Chesney version

"A Lot of Things Different" was recorded by American country artist Kenny Chesney in 2002 and appeared on his album, No Shoes, No Shirt, No Problems.

It was released in September 2002 as the third single from Chesney's album No Shoes, No Shirt, No Problems. The song reached number 6 on the US Billboard Hot Country Singles & Tracks chart in 2003.  Before Chesney's version was released, Anderson had recorded the song on his 2001 album of the same name. Chesney also used his rendition of the song as the b-side to his 2002 single "The Good Stuff".

Chart performance
"A Lot of Things Different" debuted at number 60 on the U.S. Billboard Hot Country Singles & Tracks chart for the week of September 7, 2002.

References

2001 songs
2002 singles
Bill Anderson (singer) songs
Kenny Chesney songs
Songs written by Bill Anderson (singer)
Songs written by Dean Dillon
Song recordings produced by Buddy Cannon
Song recordings produced by Norro Wilson
BNA Records singles